Mark Belling (born July 4, 1956) is an American conservative talk radio host for 1130 WISN in Milwaukee, Wisconsin. He is also a local newspaper columnist, former television host, and was a guest host for Rush Limbaugh. A native of Wisconsin's Fox Valley, Belling is an alumnus of the University of Wisconsin–La Crosse.

Radio 
Belling has been with WISN since March 1989. Before joining WISN he was news and program director of WTDY in Madison, Wisconsin, where he began his talk radio career. Belling also served as a radio news director in Springfield, Illinois; St. Joseph, Michigan; Benton Harbor, Michigan; and Oshkosh, Wisconsin.

Belling currently hosts a three-hour weekday radio program, The Mark Belling Late Afternoon Show. He discusses a wide variety of topics on his program, including sports, music, Milwaukee area politics, Wisconsin politics, and national issues. Belling leans to the right politically, and he has been known to frequently criticize local and national Republicans for straying from conservative principles. He has been criticized for his anti-Semitic statements  and derogatory sexist language  but remains popular among local conservative groups.

Other media
In addition to his daily three-hour radio program, Belling was a guest-host for Rush Limbaugh's national radio program. When doing so, WISN usually broadcasts this program twice rather than have someone fill in for Belling.

Belling writes a weekly op-ed column for the Waukesha Freeman. It usually covers local politics or scandals but occasionally remarks on national headlines and even sports.

Belling previously hosted a Sunday-morning television panel, Belling and Company, on WISN-TV (Channel 12) until 2000 when it moved to WDJT (Channel 58). The television program was discontinued in 2007, reportedly due to editorial conflicts between Belling and the management of WDJT owner Weigel Broadcasting.

Awards
Belling is a 2001 Marconi award recipient for best medium-mar In 2001 Belling was named one of the Top 100 Heavy Talkers—the most influential radio talkers in America—by Talkers Magazine, an industry publication.

Personal
Belling is involved with horse race ownership and has co-owned several over the years including 1997 Kentucky Derby entrant Captain Bodgit and 2012 Kentucky Derby entrant Went The Day Well.

References

External links
Official website

1956 births
Living people
People from Kaukauna, Wisconsin
American political commentators
American political writers
American male non-fiction writers
American talk radio hosts
University of Wisconsin–La Crosse alumni